Jackson "Action" Asiku (*21 October 1978) is a Ugandan-Australian amateur flyweight and professional feather/super featherweight boxer.

Career 
As an amateur, Asiku represented Uganda at the 1998 Commonwealth Games in Kuala Lumpur, Malaysia and won a bronze medal, losing to eventual gold medal winner Richard Sunee of Mauritius. In 1999, he won a bronze medal at flyweight in Boxing at the All-Africa Games in Johannesburg, South Africa, losing to eventual silver medal winner Nacer Keddam of Algeria. In 2000, he took part, in the Summer Olympics in Sydney, Australia, losing to Arlan Lerio of the Philippines. During his amateur time, Asiku boxed in flyweight.

As a professional, Asiku won the Australian featherweight title, World Boxing Organization (WBO) Asia Pacific featherweight title, African Boxing Union (ABU) featherweight title, International Boxing Federation (IBF) Australasian featherweight title, International Boxing Organization (IBO) featherweight title, and Commonwealth featherweight title, and was a challenger for the International Boxing Federation (IBF) Pan Pacific featherweight title against Fahprakorb Rakkiatgym.

References

External links

Image - Jackson Asiku
Image - Jackson Asiku

1978 births
Featherweight boxers
Living people
Place of birth missing (living people)
Super-featherweight boxers
Ugandan male boxers
Olympic boxers of Uganda
Boxers at the 2000 Summer Olympics
Boxers at the 1998 Commonwealth Games
Commonwealth Games bronze medallists for Uganda
Australian male boxers
Australian people of Ugandan descent
Commonwealth Boxing Council champions
Commonwealth Games medallists in boxing
African Games bronze medalists for Uganda
African Games medalists in boxing
African Boxing Union champions
International Boxing Organization champions
Competitors at the 1999 All-Africa Games
Sportspeople from Kampala
Medallists at the 1998 Commonwealth Games